Carlos Romero (born 6 July 1942) is a Mexican wrestler. He competed in the men's freestyle 78 kg at the 1968 Summer Olympics.

References

External links
 

1942 births
Living people
Mexican male sport wrestlers
Olympic wrestlers of Mexico
Wrestlers at the 1968 Summer Olympics
Sportspeople from Campeche